Elie Naasan (2 June 1931 – 4 April 2015) was a Lebanese wrestler. He competed in the men's Greco-Roman featherweight at the 1960 Summer Olympics.

References

1931 births
2015 deaths
Lebanese male sport wrestlers
Olympic wrestlers of Lebanon
Wrestlers at the 1960 Summer Olympics
People from İskenderun
Sportspeople from Hatay